M. planula may refer to a few different species.

 , a species of air-breathing land snails in the family Ariophantidae
 Magosphaera planula, a species of Protozoa in the clade Catallacta
 Megachile planula, a species of bee in the family Megachilidae
 , a species of stilt-legged flies in the family Micropezidae